Soroksár Futball Club was a Hungarian football club from the town of Pesterzsébet.

History
Soroksár Futball Club debuted in the 1932–33 season of the Hungarian League and finished twelfth.

Name Changes 
1911–1913: Soroksári Athletikai Club
1913: dissolved
1919: reestablished
1919–1920: Soroksári Munkások Testgyakorló Köre
1920–1926: Soroksári Atlétikai Club
1926–1935: Soroksár FC
1935: merger with Erzsébeti TC
1935–1936: Erzsébet-Soroksár FC 
1937–1945: Soroksári AC
1945: Soroksári MADISZ
1945: merger with Erzsébeti MADISZ
1945–1948: ErSo MaDISz
1948: merger with Soroksári Textil 
1948–1949: Soroksári Egység SE
1949–1950: Soroksári Textil SK
1950–1957: Soroksári Textiles Vörös Lobogó
1957–?: Soroksári AC

Honours
Hungarian Cup:
 Winners (1) :1933–34

References

External links
 Profile

Football clubs in Hungary
1909 establishments in Hungary